Eulepidotis affinis is a moth of the family Erebidae. It is found in the neotropics, including Costa Rica, Panama and Ecuador.

References

Moths described in 1911
affinis